Luca Ward (born 31 July 1960) is an Italian actor and voice actor.

Biography
Born in Ostia, which is in Rome and the oldest child of actor Aleardo Ward and the older brother of Andrea and Monica Ward, Ward made his debut appearance on television in 1963. He became quite popular in the field of theatre and film acting. Among his most popular roles included the 1984 teen-comedy film Chewingum directed by Biagio Proietti. He was also renowned for his role as Massimo Forti in the soap opera CentoVetrine.

Ward is well known to the Italian public as a voice-dubbing artist.  He is the official Italian voice of Pierce Brosnan, Samuel L. Jackson, Keanu Reeves and Russell Crowe, as well as occasionally dubbing Hugh Grant, Brandon Lee, Gerard Butler, Antonio Banderas and Jean-Claude Van Damme in some of their works. He dubbed voices in most of their films and he also provided the Italian voice of James Bond during his portrayal by Pierce Brosnan. In his animated roles, Ward dubbed Dr. Facilier in The Princess and the Frog as well as the title character in the Corto Maltese cartoons and Sam Fisher in the Splinter Cell video game franchise.

In 2010, Ward was a contestant on the reality show L'Isola dei Famosi but he left after a week due to an injury in the vertebral column.

Personal life
Ward was previously married to voice actress Claudia Razzi from 1983 until 2004. Their daughter Guendalina is also a voice actress. He also has an additional two children with his current wife Giada Desideri, Lupo (born 2007) and Luna (born 2009).

Filmography

Cinema
Chewingum (1984)
City Limits (2004)
Dalla parte giusta (2005)
Seven Kilometers from Jerusalem (2007)
Animanera (2008)
Scusa ma ti chiamo amore (2008)
Piazza Giochi (2010)
Nauta (2010)
Le leggi del desiderio (2015)
Under the Riccione Sun (2020)
Under the Amalfi Sun (2022)

Dubbing roles

Animation
Dr. Facilier in The Princess and the Frog
Tank Evans in Surf's Up
Lando Calrissian in The Lego Movie
Corto Maltese in Corto Maltese
Mifune in Soul Eater
Ghost of Christmas Present in A Christmas Carol
Scroop in Treasure Planet
The Prince in Happily N'Ever After
Chuck Baker in Planet 51
Rico in Home on the Range
Shredder in Teenage Mutant Ninja Turtles
RJ in Over the Hedge
Bob in Bob the Builder (1st voice)
Pale Bayleaf in Sonic X
Rodimus Convoy in Transformers: Energon
Harry Canyon in Heavy Metal (1996 redub)
Samuel L. Jackson in Team America: World Police
Jacko in ChalkZone

Live action
Jules Winnfield in Pulp Fiction
Greg Meeker in White Sands
Zeus Carver in Die Hard with a Vengeance
Ordell Robbie in Jackie Brown
Harry Adams in Sphere
Russell Franklin in Deep Blue Sea
Elijah Price / Mr. Glass in Unbreakable
Elijah Price / Mr. Glass in Glass
Elmo McElroy in The 51st State
Nathan West in Basic
Langston Whitfield in In My Country
William Marsh in Home of the Brave
Tom Cutler in Cleaner
Roland Cox in Jumper
Paul in Mother and Child
Logan in Arena
Richmond Valentine in Kingsman: The Secret Service
William Alan Moore in Big Game
Major Marquis Warren in The Hateful Eight
Mr. Barron in Miss Peregrine's Home for Peculiar Children
Darius Kincaid in The Hitman's Bodyguard
Samuel L. Jackson in Life Itself
James Bond in GoldenEye
James Bond in Tomorrow Never Dies
James Bond in The World Is Not Enough
James Bond in Die Another Day
Mike Graham in Night Watch
Alex in The Mirror Has Two Faces
Harry Dalton in Dante's Peak
Thomas Crown in The Thomas Crown Affair
Archibald "Grey Owl" Belaney in Grey Owl
Andy Osnard in The Tailor of Panama
Desmond Doyle in Evelyn
Daniel Rafferty in Laws of Attraction
Max Burdett in After the Sunset
Julian Noble in The Matador
Tom Ryan in Butterfly on a Wheel
Allen Brewer in The Greatest
Chiron in Percy Jackson & the Olympians: The Lightning Thief
Adam Lang in The Ghost Writer
Jack Abelhammer in I Don't Know How She Does It
Philip in Love Is All You Need
Guy Shepherd in The World's End
Martin Sharp in A Long Way Down
Richard Jones in The Love Punch
Peter H. Devereaux in The November Man
Richard Haig in Some Kind of Beautiful
Nash / "The Watchmaker" in Survivor
Hammond in No Escape
Sam Carmichael in Mamma Mia! Here We Go Again
Lieutenant Corbett in Blood Oath
Bud White in L.A. Confidential
Maximus Decimus Meridius in Gladiator
Terry Thorne in Proof of Life
Jack Aubrey in Master and Commander: The Far Side of the World
James J. Braddock in Cinderella Man
Max Skinner in A Good Year
Ben Wade in 3:10 to Yuma
Ed Hoffman in Body of Lies
John Brennan in The Next Three Days
Javert in Les Misérables
Jack Knife in The Man with the Iron Fists
Jor-El in Man of Steel
Pearly Soames in Winter's Tale
Joshua Connor in The Water Diviner
Jake Davis in Fathers and Daughters
Jackson Healy in The Nice Guys
Dr. Henry Jekyll in The Mummy
Marshall Eamons in Boy Erased 
Neo in The Matrix
Neo in The Matrix Reloaded
Neo in The Matrix Revolutions
Kevin Lomax in The Devil's Advocate
David Allen Griffin in The Watcher
Shane Falco in The Replacements
Donnie Barksdale in The Gift
Nelson Moss in Sweet November
Conor O'Neill in Hardball
John Constantine in Constantine
Bob Arctor in A Scanner Darkly
Alex Wyler in The Lake House
Tom Ludlow in Street Kings
Klaatu in The Day the Earth Stood Still
Chris Nadeau in The Private Lives of Pippa Lee
Donaka Mark in Man of Tai Chi
John Wick in John Wick
John Wick in John Wick: Chapter 2
John Wick in John Wick: Chapter 3 – Parabellum
Scott Galban in Exposed
The Dream in The Bad Batch
Richard Ramsay in The Whole Truth
Mike Banning in Olympus Has Fallen
Mike Banning in London Has Fallen
Mike Banning in Angel Has Fallen
Eric Draven in The Crow
Daniel Cleaver in Bridget Jones's Diary
Daniel Cleaver in Bridget Jones: The Edge of Reason
Luke Hobbs in Fast Five
Luke Hobbs in Fast & Furious 6
Terry Sheridan in Lara Croft: Tomb Raider – The Cradle of Life
Count Dracula / Judas Iscariot in Dracula 2000
Mufasa in The Lion King

Video games
Sam Fisher in Tom Clancy's Splinter Cell
Sam Fisher in Tom Clancy's Splinter Cell: Pandora Tomorrow
Sam Fisher in Tom Clancy's Splinter Cell: Chaos Theory
Sam Fisher in Tom Clancy's Splinter Cell: Blacklist
El Sueño in Tom Clancy's Ghost Recon Wildlands
Johnny Silverhand in Cyberpunk 2077

References

External links

1960 births
Living people
Male actors from Rome
Italian people of American descent
People of Tuscan descent
Italian male voice actors
Italian male television actors
Italian male film actors
Italian male stage actors
Italian male video game actors
Italian voice directors
Participants in Italian reality television series
20th-century Italian male actors
21st-century Italian male actors